The fourth Central American and Caribbean Games were held in Panama City, the capital city of Panama at Estadio Juan Demóstenes Arosemena. These games were held 3 years after the last games, this was to get the games back to the year they should have been, after a 5-year break on the previous games. The Games were held from 5 February to 24 February 1938. They included 1,216 athletes from ten nations, competing in sixteen different sports.

Sports

Medal table

References
 Meta
 

 
Central American and Caribbean Games, 1938
Central American and Caribbean Games
Central American and Caribbean Games, 1938
1938 in Central American sport
1938 in Caribbean sport
1938 in Panama
Multi-sport events in Panama
20th century in Panama City
Sports competitions in Panama City
February 1938 sports events